Wanjiru Kinyanjui (born 1958) is a Kenyan writer, poet, journalist and filmmaker.

Life
Kinyanjui received a master's in English and German literature before studying film at the German Film and Television Academy Berlin. 

Kinyanjui's 1994 film Battle of the Sacred Tree, focusing on a woman caught between traditional Kikuyu values and 'modern' practices, was financially supported, produced and distributed by Birne Film (Germany) and Flamingo Films (France). This film, shot in Kenya, as well as Kinyanjui's short film A Lover & Killer of Colours were part of the Forum Special Program at the 2023 Berlinale.

Filmography
 The Sick Bird, 1991
 Black in the Western World, 1992
 Battle of the Sacred Tree, 1994
 …If Joined by a Stranger […Wenn nein Fremder dazu kommt] (1987)
 The Reunion (1988)
 A Lover and Killer of Colour (1988)
 Karfunkel – Der Vogel mit dem gebrochenen Flügel (1990)
 Clara Has Two Countries (1992)
 Vitico, a Living Legend (1993)
 Die Rechte der Kinder – Der aufgespürte Vater (1997)
 Koi and Her Rights [Koi na Haki Zake] (1997)
 Daudi’s Gift [Zawaki ya Daudi] (1997)
 Die Rechte der Kinder – Anruf aus Afrika (1998)
 African Children (1999)
 And This Is Progress (2000)
 Say No to Poverty (2001)
 Member of the Jury (2001)
 Manga in America (2007)
 Bahati (2008)
 Africa Is a Woman’s Name – Amai Rose: A Portrait of a Zimbabwean Woman (2009)

References

 https://africanfilmny.org/directors/wanjiru-kinyanjui/

External links
 

1958 births
Living people
Kenyan writers
Kenyan poets
Kenyan journalists
Kenyan film directors